Kapsēde is one of the suburbs of Liepāja, Latvia.

References 

Neighbourhoods in Liepāja